Saqsa Punta (Quechua saqsa multi-colored, punta peak, ridge, "multi-colored peak (or ridge)", also spelled Sacsa Punta) is a  mountain in the Andes of Peru. It is located in the Huánuco Region, Huánuco Province, Churubamba District. Saqsa Punta lies north of Saqra Waqra.

References

Mountains of Peru
Mountains of Huánuco Region